The Euram Bank Open is a golf tournament on the Challenge Tour. It was first played in July 2018 at Golf Club Adamstal in Ramsau, Austria. Adamstal hosted the MAN NÖ Open on the Challenge Tour from 2006 to 2008.

In 2020, the tournament was a dual ranking event with the European Tour, due to revamp of the European and Challenge Tour's schedules because of the COVID-19 pandemic.

Winners

Notes

References

External links
Coverage on the Challenge Tour's official site

Former European Tour events
Challenge Tour events
Golf tournaments in Austria
Sport in Lower Austria
2018 establishments in Europe
Recurring sporting events established in 2018